is a railway station of Hokkaido Railway Company (JR Hokkaido). It is located beneath the Domestic Terminal building of New Chitose Airport in Chitose, Hokkaido, Japan.

Lines
The station is served by the Chitose Line.

Layout
Underground station with one island platform serving two tracks.
 Platforms

See also
 List of railway stations in Japan

Railway stations in Japan opened in 1992
Railway stations in Hokkaido Prefecture
Airport railway stations in Japan
Chitose, Hokkaido